Vijaykumar Vyshak (born 31 January 1997) is an Indian cricketer. He made his List A debut on 24 February 2021, for Karnataka in the 2020–21 Vijay Hazare Trophy. He made his Twenty20 debut on 5 November 2021, for Karnataka in the 2021–22 Syed Mushtaq Ali Trophy. He made his first-class debut on 17 February 2022, for Karnataka in the 2021–22 Ranji Trophy.

References

External links
 

1997 births
Living people
Indian cricketers
Karnataka cricketers
Place of birth missing (living people)